Here Comes the Rumour Mill is a song by English indie rock band Young Knives and is featured on their debut album, Voices of Animals and Men. It was released on 27 February 2006 and reached a peak position of #36 in the UK Singles Chart.

Track listing

CD:

"Here Comes the Rumour Mill" – 3:32
"We Are the Also Rans" – 3:06

7" vinyl:

"Here Comes the Rumour Mill" – 3:32
"We Are the Also Rans" – 3:06
"Elaine" – 4:14
"Kitchener" – 2:58

2006 singles
Transgressive Records singles
2006 songs